The Tramp and the Crap Game is a silent film from the year 1900.  It's unknown if a copy survives, but it could be lost. It is unwatchable on computers.

References

External links

1900 films
American silent short films
American black-and-white films
1900s American films